Armillaria gemina is a species of mushroom in the family Physalacriaceae. In North America, this rare species is found from the Appalachian Mountains eastwards. The mycelium of the fungus is bioluminescent.

See also
List of Armillaria species

References

gemina
Bioluminescent fungi
Fungi of North America
Fungal tree pathogens and diseases
Fungi described in 1989